Jugi may refer to:

 Jugi, Poland, a village
 Jugi, Iran (disambiguation), several villages
 an alternative spelling of Jogi, the name of several South Asian communities

See also 
 Juggy (disambiguation)
 Jagi (disambiguation)